Madeline Perry (born 11 February 1977 in Banbridge, Northern Ireland) is a former professional squash player from Northern Ireland. She was raised in Northern Ireland and lives in Philadelphia.

In November 2006 at the World Open in Belfast, she justified her seeding of eighth by reaching the quarter finals. She then won the Irish Open 2007 title in Dublin. Her career highlights is at the defeat to Nicol David in the quarter finals of the Forexx Dutch Open where she took the world number one to 9–7 in the fourth set. However, a serious head injury sustained when Madeline was mugged in Milan, Italy, put a halt to the rest of the season.

The inactivity caused a dip in her ranking that took her out of the top ten after nearly two years. In her first event back in 2008, in the Buler Challenge in Hong Kong, she reached the final. A year later, Perry described her quarter-final defeat of then-ranked No. 1 Nicol David in the five-set, 76-minute quarter-final of the 2009 British Open as "the best victory of my career". (Perry lost the final to Rachael Grinham.) She then made it to the semis of the Seoul Open, followed by the semi final berth at the CIMB Singapore Masters from an unseeded position and, by April 2011, Perry had reached a career-high world ranking of No. 3. In April 2014 she made squash history as the oldest female player to retain a top 10 position, when she was ranked at No. 9 in the world.

Major World Series final appearances

British Open: 1 finals (0 title, 1 runner-up)

Qatar Classic: 1 final (0 title, 1 runner-up)

See also
 Official Women's Squash World Ranking

References

External links 
 
 
 

Irish female squash players
Living people
1977 births
People from Banbridge
Squash players at the 2010 Commonwealth Games
Commonwealth Games competitors for Northern Ireland
Sportspeople from County Down